Weathercraft is a 2010 graphic novel by American cartoonist Jim Woodring, featuring his best-known characters Frank, Manhog and Whim.  While Frank stars in most of Woodring's stories set in the fictional universe of the Unifactor, this book stars Manhog, with Frank making only a brief appearance.  Manhog, after trials and tribulations, sets out on a transformative journey, returning to face off against the devilish Whim, who has enslaved and transformed his friends.  Like all other stories set in the Unifactor, Weathercraft unfolds entirely in pictures, with no dialogue balloons or captions.  Weathercraft was Woodring's first book-length work.

Publication history
Weathercraft was published in book form without previously being serialized, a first for Woodring.  Some panels of the book were previewed on Woodring's blog leading up to publication.  When asked in an interview with The A.V. Club why, after 30 years of doing comics, he had now decided to produce his first graphic novel, he replied:

The dust jacket was quite verbose, in contrast with the pantomime of the book itself.  On this he said, "I thought it would be funny to have a book that was almost word-free and a dust jacket that was slathered in copy."

Overview

Weathercraft, like all of the works set in Woodring's Unifactor (the world in which Frank and associated characters appear), is executed in wordless pantomime, with no word balloons or captions of any kind.  In contrast, the dust jacket is quite verbose, and provides clues to the interpretation of the story.  "[A] cyclical telling of Manhog's suffering, punishment and enlightenment", the book actually stars Manhog, with Frank only appearing briefly.  Another recurring character, the devilish Whim, also features.

The book is dense and intricate.  It rewards (or requires) re-readings, and "blends [Woodring's] understanding of Vedantic beliefs with stylized, Max Fleischer nightmares to explore ideas about the evolution of consciousness. As if to hammer home this mysticism, Woodring notes that the Sanskrit symbol for the sacred syllable Aum [] is hidden on each page."  Every detail of the book has meaning to Woodring, although he accepts and encourages "reader participation" and further or alternate interpretations.

Plot
After merging with a psychoactive plant known as Salvia divinorum, Whim proceeds to "distort and enslave Frank and his friends".  After much suffering, Manhog sets out on a transformative journey, attaining enlightenment.  Manhog then returns for a final encounter with Whim.

Characters
Manhog  "[A] freakish creature that is often depicted as hedonistic villain whenever he isn't being forced to suffer."  With some notable exceptions like the short story Gentlemanhog, Manhog is normally a secondary character in the stories set in the Unifactor, where Frank is normally the star.The significant thing for Manhog in Weathercraft, according to Woodring, "is that [Manhog] feels morally obligated to clean up after himself" after being "responsible for Whim's acquiring a hallucinogenic plant-body...a first for him. He passes up a chance to enter paradise in order to do the right thing."

Whim  As in so many other stories, this devilish, perpetually smiling, moon-headed character spends his time tantalizing and torturing the inhabitants of the Unifactor.  "[A]t one point [he] merges with a psychoactive plant called Salvia divinorum" and "distorts and enslaves Frank and his friends."
Frank  Normally the main character of the stories set in the Unifactor, Frank plays a small but important role in this book, distorted and enslaved by Whim early in the book.
Pupshaw and Pushpaw  Companions and protectors of Frank, they are distorted and enslaved along with him by the now super powerful Whim.
Frank's Faux Paw  Quadrupedal "bad conscience" of Frank, he plays a minor but critical role in the book.  When participating in a forced marriage that is interrupted by Manhog, he reveals the location of the transformed Whim.
"Betty and Veronica"  Described  on the dust jacket as "our grossly inappropriate pet names for the unchristened hags" who "seem to have elemental control over [Manhog's] life".  They are "two bird-like hags that mysteriously propel the story from the sidelines through rituals that alter the weather and, in turn, alter Manhog’s course". The pet names are taken from the characters Betty and Veronica from Archie comic books.

Reception
The book was included on numerous "Best of 2010" lists, including:
 The 2010 Los Angeles Times Book Prize for Graphic Novels (as Finalist)
 Publishers Weekly's Best Books of 2010
Douglas Wolk's Best Graphic Novels of 2010 at TIME.com – Techland (ranked #6)

Foreign editions

See also

Alternative comics
Graphic novel

References

Further reading

External links
Weathercraft by Jim Woodring - Video Preview
Jim Woodring talks about Weathercraft
Interview at The A.V. Club
Review at Comics Alliance

2010 graphic novels
2010 comics debuts
American graphic novels
Comics by Jim Woodring
Books by Jim Woodring
Fantagraphics titles